Pasquale A. "Pat" Buba (April 16, 1946 – September 12, 2018) was an American film editor, noted for his longtime collaboration with George A. Romero.

Biography 
Pasquale Buba was born in 1946 as the second child of Edward Buba (d. 1997) and Angeline Buba (née Gentile; 1921–2017). His mother, who was born in the Italian city of Tursi, came to the United States in 1929. Buba grew up in Braddock, Pennsylvania, together with his older brother Anthony "Tony" Buba (born 1943).

Buba started to work as a sound engineer and editor in the early 1970s for Pittsburgh's WQED. Together with John Harrison and Dusty Nelson he founded the small Pittsburgh-based production company BuDuDa in 1973. The company, which was later renamed to The Image Works, produced commercial and industrial films.

He later met George A. Romero and had two short appearances in his films: as drug dealer in Martin and as biker in Dawn of the Dead. For Romero's next film Knightriders Buba supported Romero during the editing of the film, which Romero had done alone on all of his previous films. In 1985 Buba edited Romero's Day of the Dead. Both continued to work on films such as Monkey Shines, Two Evil Eyes and The Dark Half.

In 1995, Buba together with William Goldenberg, Dov Hoenig and Tom Rolf edited Michael Mann's film Heat, starring Robert De Niro and Al Pacino. Afterwards Buba was one of the editors for Pacino's directional debut Looking for Richard. Buba worked again with Pacino in 2000 for Chinese Coffee, in 2011 for Wilde Salomé and 2013 for Salomé.

Pasquale Buba was a member of American Cinema Editors.

He married production manager Zilla Clinton in 1983, and remained together until his death in 2018.

Death
Buba died in his home in Los Angeles on September 12, 2018, at the age of 72, after a lengthy battle with lung cancer. His funeral was held on November 24.

Selected filmography

Film editing
1975: The Winners (documentary series, 1 episode)
1975: Mister Rogers' Neighborhood (television series, 7 episodes)
1980: Effects
1981: Knightriders
1982: Creepshow (segment: The Lonesome Death of Jordy Verrill)
1985: Day of the Dead
1988: Monkey Shines
1989: Stepfather II
1990: Two Evil Eyes (segment: The Black Cat)
1990: Tales from the Crypt (television series, 3 episodes)
1993: The Dark Half
1993: Striking Distance
1995: Heat
1996: Looking for Richard (documentary)
1997: The Brave
1999: Simpatico
2000: The In Crowd
2000: Chinese Coffee
2003: I Witness
2004: Bobby Jones: Stroke of Genius
2005: Babbleonia (documentary)
2011: Wilde Salomé (documentary)
2013: Salomé

Acting
1977: Martin - Drug dealer shot by police
1978: Dawn of the Dead - Motorcycle raider (final film role)

Producer
1980: Effects

References

External links 
 

1946 births
2018 deaths
American film editors
American Cinema Editors
American people of Italian descent
People from Braddock, Pennsylvania